Hoseyn Talai (also Romanized as Ḩoseyn Ţalā’ī, Hosein Tala’i, Ḩoselyn Ţālā’ī, and Ḩoseyn Ţala’ī) is a village in Khaveh-ye Shomali Rural District, in the Central District of Delfan County, Lorestan Province, Iran. At the 2006 census, its population was 168, in 37 families.

References 

Towns and villages in Delfan County